Kim So-ra (born 18 July 1998) is a South Korean handball player for the Korea National Sport University and the South Korean national team.

She participated at the 2017 World Women's Handball Championship.

References

1998 births
Living people
South Korean female handball players
Handball players at the 2014 Summer Youth Olympics
Youth Olympic gold medalists for South Korea